Rostyslav Horetskyi (born 4 February 1979 in Ukraine, Soviet Union) is a professional Ukrainian football defender who plays for FC Lviv in the Ukrainian Premier League.

External links
Profile on Official FC Lviv Website
Profile on EUFO

1979 births
Living people
Ukrainian footballers
FC Lviv (1992) players
FC Lviv players
FC Hoverla Uzhhorod players
FC Dynamo Lviv players
FC Karpaty-2 Lviv players
FC Arsenal-Kyivshchyna Bila Tserkva players
FC Hazovyk-Skala Stryi players
Association football defenders